Mariangela Piancastelli (born 20 May 1953) is an Italian basketball player. She competed in the women's tournament at the 1980 Summer Olympics.

References

1953 births
Living people
Italian women's basketball players
Olympic basketball players of Italy
Basketball players at the 1980 Summer Olympics
Sportspeople from Ferrara